Thomas W Bache (born 1938), is a male former boxer who competed for England.

Boxing career
He represented England and won a silver medal in the -51 Kg division at the 1958 British Empire and Commonwealth Games in Cardiff, Wales.

He made his professional debut on 24 March 1960 and fought in six fights until 1963.

References

1938 births
English male boxers
Commonwealth Games medallists in boxing
Commonwealth Games silver medallists for England
Boxers at the 1958 British Empire and Commonwealth Games
Living people
Flyweight boxers
Medallists at the 1958 British Empire and Commonwealth Games